Southwork is an American seven piece indie rock band, based in Philadelphia, Pennsylvania, United States. The band features a horn section as well as layered vocal harmonies and percussion.
The band produced their latest studio album Wear Your Heart Out" in 2014.

Discography
Albums
 Arise (December 2012, Writtenhouse Records)
 Alpha Girls Original Motion Picture Soundtrack (Writtenhouse Records) 
 Seasons Passing EP July 2013
 Wear Your Heart Out'' August 2014
 Southwork "Self-Titled" EP January 2017

References

External links
Official Website

Indie rock musical groups from Pennsylvania
Musical groups from Philadelphia